Nord Anglia International School Dubai, also known as NAS Dubai, is an international school located in Dubai, United Arab Emirates. 

Nord Anglia International School Dubai is part of the Nord Anglia Education. The 66 Nord Anglia schools are located across 29 countries in the Americas, Europe, China, Southeast Asia and the Middle East and educate more than 61,000 students from kindergarten through to the end of secondary/high school.

NAS Dubai currently offers the English National Curriculum for students aged 3 – 18, culminating in i/GCSE examinations years. Students then transition to the International Baccalaureate Diploma Programme IB Diploma Programme for Year 12 and Year 13 (aged 16 – 18).

History 
Founded in 1972, Nord Anglia Education schools are located in the Americas, Europe, China, Southeast Asia and the Middle East. The 66 schools are home to over 51,000 students between the ages of 2 and 18 years. Schools of Nord Anglia Education follow different curricula including the English National Curriculum which is adapted to fit the needs of each region, IGCSEs, A Levels, the International Baccalaureate Diploma Programme, the French Baccalaureate and the Swiss Maturité.

Facilities 
The school is home to two 25-metre swimming pools, 2 learner pools, 525-seater theatre, tennis courts, basketball courts, three dining rooms, drama and dance studios, music rooms, running tracks, football pitch, G4 rugby pitch, a pirate ship playground and large outdoor space.

References

External links 
 Nord Anglia International School Dubai website
 
 Nord Anglia International School Dubai on Expat Woman 

2013 establishments in the United Arab Emirates
British international schools in Dubai
International schools in Dubai
Educational institutions established in 2013
Nord Anglia Education